The Walton's Coal Incline was a nineteenth-century incline, used to transport coal from a mine mouth just west of West Elizabeth, Pennsylvania to a tipple on pool 2 of the Monongahela River.  It crossed the entire width of the Borrough of West Elizabeth, passing over the Pittsburgh, Virginia and Charleston Railway.

See also 
 List of funicular railways

References

History of Allegheny County, Pennsylvania
Defunct funicular railways in the United States
Railway inclines in Pittsburgh